The Taipei Open, formerly named the Chinese Taipei Open Grand Prix Gold (2007–2017) and Chinese Taipei Open (2018–2019), is an open badminton international championships held in Taiwan since the 1970s, but they took place only in irregular periods. Since 1980 they are regularly held, except in 1998, due to the Asian economic crisis, 2001, 2020, and 2021, the latter two due to the COVID-19 pandemic in Taiwan.

Past winners

Performances by nation

See also 
 List of sporting events in Taiwan

References

External links 
Smash: Chinese Taipei Open
Chinese Taipei Open 2011 official website

 
BWF World Tour
Badminton tournaments in Taiwan